The Third Encirclement Campaigns is an abbreviated name used for several different encirclement campaigns launched by the Nationalist Government with the goal of destroying the developing Chinese Red Army and its communist bases in several separate locations in China during the early stage of Chinese Civil War between the late 1920s to mid-1930s, and these are:

 Third Encirclement Campaign against Jiangxi Soviet, July 1 to September 18, 1931
 Third Encirclement Campaign against Hubei-Henan-Anhui Soviet, November 1931 to June 17, 1932
 Third Encirclement Campaign against Hubei-Henan-Shaanxi Soviet
 Third Encirclement Campaign against Honghu Soviet, September 1931 to May 30, 1932
 Third Encirclement Campaign against Shaanxi-Gansu Soviet, August 1935 to October 25, 1935